Stay Up, Get Down is the first EP by the band, The Maine, and was released on May 8, 2007. The EP was re-released in January 2012 as part of the band's celebrations for their fifth anniversary which includes a remix of The Town's Been Talkin' featuring Nick Santino of A Rocket To The Moon as a bonus track.

Track listing
All lyrics written by John O'Callaghan and Jared Monaco, all music composed by The Maine

Personnel
Members 
 John O'Callaghan - lead vocals, piano
 Ryan Osterman - lead guitar
 Alex Ross - rhythm guitar
 Garrett Nickelsen - bass
 Patrick Kirch - drums, percussion

References

External links
 iTunes | Stay Up Get Down EP
 

The Maine (band) EPs
2007 albums